Mauro Sergio Bustamante (born 23 June 1991) is an Argentine professional footballer who plays as a forward for Bolivian club Nacional Potosí.

References

External links
 
 

1991 births
Living people
Argentine footballers
Footballers from Santa Fe, Argentina
Association football forwards
Club Atlético Colón footballers
Naval de Talcahuano footballers
Club San José players
S.D. Aucas footballers
Deportivo Pereira footballers
L.D.U. Portoviejo footballers
Alianza Petrolera players
Guayaquil City F.C. footballers
A.C.C.D. Mineros de Guayana players
Nacional Potosí players
Primera B de Chile players
Ecuadorian Serie A players
Ecuadorian Serie B players
Bolivian Primera División players
Categoría Primera A players
Categoría Primera B players
Venezuelan Primera División players
Argentine expatriate footballers
Expatriate footballers in Chile
Argentine expatriate sportspeople in Chile
Expatriate footballers in Ecuador
Argentine expatriate sportspeople in Ecuador
Expatriate footballers in Bolivia
Argentine expatriate sportspeople in Bolivia
Expatriate footballers in Colombia
Argentine expatriate sportspeople in Colombia
Expatriate footballers in Venezuela
Argentine expatriate sportspeople in Venezuela